John Arthur Ljunggren (9 September 1919 – 13 January 2000) was a Swedish race walker. He competed in the 50 kilometer event at the 1948, 1952, 1956, 1960 and 1964 Olympics and finished in first, ninth, third, second and 16th place, respectively. At the European Championships he won a gold medal in 1946, a silver medal in 1950, and finished fourth in 1954 and fifth in 1962.

Ljunggren got used to long walks as a child, along with his brothers Verner and Gunnar, as they did not have bicycles. He was known for his walking technique, and was never disqualified during his 499 races. He also competed nationally in cycling, orienteering, running and cross-country skiing. Ljunggren was used to hot, but not cold weather; so he got cramps in the cold Helsinki at the 1952 Olympics and finished ninth. At the 1960 Games in Rome, a friendly race official poured a bucket of ice water close to the finish; Ljunggren cramped again and finished second. At the 1956 Olympics he got a bad infection in a toe before the final race, yet managed to finish third.

Ljunggren continued race walking until 1984, and won the 20 km event at the 1977 World Championships in the masters category. An accountant by trade, he was deeply religious.

References

1919 births
2000 deaths
Swedish male racewalkers
Olympic gold medalists for Sweden
Olympic silver medalists for Sweden
Olympic bronze medalists for Sweden
Athletes (track and field) at the 1948 Summer Olympics
Athletes (track and field) at the 1952 Summer Olympics
Athletes (track and field) at the 1956 Summer Olympics
Athletes (track and field) at the 1960 Summer Olympics
Athletes (track and field) at the 1964 Summer Olympics
Olympic athletes of Sweden
European Athletics Championships medalists
Medalists at the 1960 Summer Olympics
Medalists at the 1956 Summer Olympics
Medalists at the 1948 Summer Olympics
Olympic gold medalists in athletics (track and field)
Olympic silver medalists in athletics (track and field)
Olympic bronze medalists in athletics (track and field)
20th-century Swedish people